O-4210 is a drug developed by Organix Inc which acts as a selective dopamine reuptake inhibitor, with good selectivity over the serotonin transporter but its activity at the noradrenaline transporter is not known. It is a thiatropane derivative, related in chemical structure to phenyltropane derivatives such as RTI-126 and RTI-171, but with the amine nitrogen replaced by sulfur, demonstrating that this nitrogen only plays a minor contribution to receptor binding, in a similar manner to the related oxatropane tropoxane.

See also
 List of phenyltropanes

References 

Dopamine reuptake inhibitors